Ebenezer is a village in the Canadian province of Saskatchewan within the Rural Municipality of Orkney No. 244 and Census Division No. 9. The village is located 18 km north of the City of Yorkton, on Highway 9.

History 
The first settlers arrived between 1885 and 1887, mostly German-speaking Protestants who named the village after the location of Eben-Ezer mentioned in the Books of Samuel of the Old Testament.
Ebenezer incorporated as a village on July 1, 1948.
High speed internet became available in 2015 in this hamlet.

Demographics 

References

Villages in Saskatchewan
Orkney No. 244, Saskatchewan
Division No. 9, Saskatchewan
German-Canadian culture in Saskatchewan